This article lists the locomotives and railcars/multiple units of the Deutsche Bundesbahn (DB), the German Federal Railways, that were in service between 1949 and 1993. For vehicles of the Deutsche Bahn see the List of DBAG locomotives and railbuses.

Steam locomotive classes are arranged in accordance with the DRG classification system; electric and diesel locomotives, railbuses and works vehicles are listed in accordance with the DB classification scheme. Classes that were fully retired before 1968 are listed under the classification allocated to them by the DB up to 1967. In the case of petrol-driven railbuses, a new classification system was introduced in the late 1940s that was only valid in the western zones of occupation and therefore with the later DB.

Steam locomotives 

The table gives the vehicle class in the first column that was used by the Deutsche Bundesbahn who adopted the DRG classification system; if necessary, figures based on the running numbers are also given where this is needed to identify the sub-classes.

In the second column the class numbers are from the DB classification scheme used from 1968 onwards. Where there is no entry in this column, all the engines had been retired by the beginning of 1968.

The Deutsche Bundesbahn retired its last steam locomotives by 1977 and completely ceased all steam traction operations by 1985.

Electric locomotives 

The electric vehicles of the Deutsche Bundesbahn have been designed for operating with a voltage of 15 kV, 16,667 Hz.

Diesel locomotives

Electric multiple units (EMU, "Elektrische Triebwagen")

Battery electric multiple units ("Akkumulatortriebwagen")

Diesel multiple units ("Verbrennungstriebwagen") including Diesel railbuses

Steam Railbuses

DB Works Vehicles

References

See also 
Deutsche Bundesbahn
UIC classification

Locomotives of Germany
Deutsche Bundesbahn locomotives
Deutsche Bundesbahn